BFM may refer to:

Broadcasting
 bFM, a station in the Student Radio Network in New Zealand
 BFM 89.9, a Malaysian radio station
 BFM Business, a French business news radio station
 BFM TV, a French rolling news TV channel
 Bob FM, an FM radio brand in Canada and the United States

Science
 Background field method, a procedure to calculate the effective action of a quantum field theory
 Bacterial flagellar motor of a cell flagellum
 Bond fluctuation model, a model for simulating polymer systems

Other
 Bahrain Freedom Movement, a group opposing the Bahraini government 
 Baitul Futuh Mosque, London
 Baltic Film and Media School, Estonia 
 Baptist Faith and Message, a statement of faith by the Southern Baptists in the United States 
 Basic fighter maneuvers for fighter aircraft 
 Better Futures Minnesota, a social enterprise based in Minneapolis
 Bill Murray, an American actor
 Bonded Fibre Matrix, hydroseeding mulch used for erosion control
 Brasserie des Franches-Montagnes, a Swiss brewery
 Brave Fencer Musashi, a role-playing game
 Bund für Menschenrecht, a 1920s German gay rights organisation
 Bus Functional Model, a software model of an integrated circuit component
 Mobile Downtown Airport (IATA airport code), in Mobile, Alabama